Doctors is a British medical soap opera, first broadcast on BBC One on 26 March 2000. Set in the fictional West Midlands town of Letherbridge, the soap follows the lives of the staff of both an NHS doctor's surgery and a university campus surgery, as well as the lives of their families and friends. Initially, only 41 episodes of the programme were ordered, but due to the positive reception, the BBC ordered it as a continuing soap opera. Doctors was filmed at the Pebble Mill Studios until 2004; production then relocated to the BBC Drama Village. Episodes are filmed three months prior to transmission. The soap is typically broadcast on weekdays at 1:45 pm on BBC One and takes three annual transmission breaks across the year; at Easter, during the summer and at Christmas.

Since its inception, Doctors has consistently won the share of viewers in its daytime time slot, and as of 2022, it averages at 1.6 million live viewers in its daytime broadcast. The programme has been nominated for and won numerous awards, with critics praising them for tackling issues that are considered to be controversial and taboo issues in British culture and social life that are typically unseen on British television. Earlier episodes of Doctors featured a noticeably smaller cast, with episodes more self-contained. However, as the episode output heightened, the cast also increased to include more continuing storylines. The longest serving cast member is currently Adrian Lewis Morgan, who was cast in the role of Jimmi Clay in 2005. Alongside its regular cast, Doctors features numerous guest characters who typically appear in an episode as part of a self-contained "story of the day". Series producer Peter Eryl Lloyd estimated that at least 800 guest stars are contracted on the soap per year. Due to the large number of actors who have made a guest appearance, Doctors has gained a reputation for becoming "a British actor's rite of passage".

Production

Creation and time slot
Doctors is produced by BBC Birmingham and is screened on BBC One. It was created by Chris Murray, with Mal Young as the original executive producer. Musician Paul Hemmings was hired to compose the theme music for the opening and closing titles. When the series premiered, Jane Lush, the BBC's head of daytime programming, felt that commissioning Doctors was an ambitious move. She thought that the series offered something new and that viewers would not realise they would want a series like Doctors until they had seen it. Lush noted that despite its serial element, the premise of the programme meant that people could "dip in and out" since the core cast would stay the same and the episodes would be self-contained. Young echoed Lush's comments and said that he had wanted to create a daytime drama series long before his involvement with Doctors. Young felt that the previously unfilled daytime slot would be good for the series due to there being an increase of remote workers in 2000. Doctors was originally shown at 12:30 pm as a lead-in to BBC News at One. For a brief trial period in mid-2000, certain episodes from the first series were shown on Fridays at 7:00 pm, but due to rival soap Emmerdale being transmitted at the same time, Doctors suffered from low ratings, and was instead trialled in a 2:10 pm time slot. The series later moved into its current timeslot of 1:45 pm in 2008. Cast member Diane Keen opined that Doctors should be broadcast in a primetime slot, but Liam Keelan, controller of BBC Daytime schedules, commented: "its true home will always be as a hugely appreciated early afternoon drama".

In a 2010 review of BBC continuing dramas, it was reported by Digital Spy that Doctors regularly won the largest share in its time slot, and attracted consistent audience numbers, with an average of 2 million viewers per episode. In 2020, executive producer Mike Hobson was asked by Allison Jones of Inside Soap if he would consider a late-night time slot, to which he commented: "for our audience, we sit quite nicely". He felt that if the soap was shown at nighttime, producers would "still tackle all the powerful subject matters [they do now], and that seeing more sexual or swearing scenes would not add to the quality of the programme". In February 2022, it was announced that alongside its transmission at 1:45 pm on BBC One, episodes would be repeated at 7:00 pm on BBC Two. Kate Oates, head of continuing drama at the BBC, said that her motivation to give Doctors a primetime evening slot was to give the programme a push for a new audience. The change took place from 7 March 2022. Despite being billed as a permanent change, the BBC Two repeats were dropped from the schedule after two months.

Filming and locations

Since the programme's inception, Doctors has filmed episodes three months in advance of broadcast. The episodes are filmed from January to November, and due to the effect weather has on the output, producers implement "seasonal episodes" to give the impression that the soap is set in real time. Episodes are filmed in groups of three, described as a "block". Each of the blocks have the same production crew and it takes seven days to shoot each block. Usually, two blocks are filmed at once, although, there are instances where three blocks are filmed at once. When there are three blocks being filmed, the regular cast members can be filming up to nine episodes within the same period of time. On his experience on the soap, former cast member Christopher Timothy said: "The budget was a joke and the pressure more intense than anything I'd ever experienced. But it was six years of great fun". Each of the regular cast members are allocated a private dressing room, while guests and recurring cast are given a shared dressing room behind the wardrobe department.

From 2000 to 2004, Doctors was filmed at the BBC's former Pebble Mill studios in Edgbaston. The series used space originally occupied by Pebble Mill at One. A set was built especially for the series, with the BBC hoping that the series would become a "fixture of daytime schedules" like fellow BBC soap Neighbours. After the closure of Pebble Mill, BBC Birmingham moved to a smaller production base in Birmingham City Centre which had no studio space for the show. In 2004, production moved again to the BBC Drama Village development in Selly Oak. To explain the transition between locations on screen, the soap featured a storyline in which the Riverside Health Centre, named after the series' original production home, is destroyed by an explosion, prompting the move to the Mill Health Centre. Alongside the Mill, which is filmed in Melville House, other regular locations include Letherbridge Police Station and the Icon Bar (filmed in Barrow-Cadbury House), the University of Letherbridge's Campus Surgery (filmed in Archibald House), St Phils Hospital (filmed outside of the Orchard Learning Resources Centre), HMP Letherbank Prison and Sutton Vale surgery (filmed in Wallis House/St Andrew's Hall). In 2022, BBC Birmingham announced that its base and all of its productions would be moving from Selly Oak to Digbeth in 2026.

Annual breaks
Doctors takes two holiday-related annual breaks; at Easter and Christmas. On 4 June 2016, it was confirmed that Doctors was to take a three-month transmission break from 10 June 2016; the first long break since 2006. It was replaced by coverage of UEFA Euro 2016, Wimbledon, Rio 2016 Olympics and Red Rock. The series returned on 30 August 2016. It has since taken annual breaks during the summer. It was later explained that the break is implemented so that the cast and crew have enough time to produce episodes to air throughout the rest of the year due to the small budget given to the programme; having the series not air during the summer allows for them to catch up with the pace of production.

History

2000–2016: Decade of Doctors and 3000 episodes
The first episode of Doctors was transmitted on 26 March 2000. In 2002, episodes received an average of 2.5 million viewers. Young departed from the position of executive producer on 6 April 2005, with Will Trotter assuming the position from the next day. In April 2006, Doctors aired the first same-sex wedding on British television when characters Greg Robinson (Ben Jones) and Rico Da Silva (Felix D'Alviella) got married. In 2009, the episode which reached the highest ratings in Doctors history was "Restraint" which was aired on 31 March. The episode saw Ruth Pearce (Selina Chilton) admitted to a psychiatric hospital after developing an obsession over colleague and friend Michelle Corrigan (Donnaleigh Bailey). Another episode in 2009 that reached 3.4 million viewers was "Cold Comfort", which was the last episode aired in 2009; it involved the Christmas party, which saw Lily Hassan's (Seeta Indrani) marriage proposal to Heston Carter (Owen Brenman) turned down. On 26 March 2010, Doctors celebrated its 10th anniversary and 1800th episode. Under the title Decade of Doctors, the BBC aired five-minute episodes about the series after each day's episode during the anniversary week. In each episode, cast and crew members talked about topics including the conception of the series, their favourite storylines and facts about Doctors. That year, the highest watched episode received 2.9 million viewers. The average for the year was 2 million viewers.

On 16 February 2011, Doctors aired its 2000th episode titled "Quarantine", which was extended and ran for 60 minutes. From 17 September 2012 for 5 days, special red button episodes aired after the regular episodes, focusing on the conclusion of the Harrison Kellor (James Larkin) storyline, exploring Elaine Cassidy (Janet Dibley) and how she dealt with Harrison's change of plea for Lauren Porter's (Alexis Peterman) murder. In 2012, Doctors aired a "Shakespeare week", with episodes themed around "a number of his most popular plays". On 16 June 2015, Trotter departed from the position of executive producer, with Mike Hobson assuming the position from the next day. Episodes in that year averaged at 1.7 million viewers, with the highest rating of the year being 1.94 million. In February 2015, Doctors sparked criticism after the word "pussy" was used in an episode. Due to the programme being transmitted in the daytime, the claims of "offensive language" led to an investigation by Ofcom, a broadcasting regulator. They were later cleared of any breaches of the code, with an Ofcom spokesperson stating: "Following investigation, we found this BBC One soap didn't break our rules for offensive language before the watershed. The language used in the show was justified by the context it was presented in and aired at a time when children were unlikely to be watching."

On 10 September 2015, Doctors aired its 3000th episode, "The Heart of England", which was extended and ran for 60 minutes. The average viewing figures for 2015 was 2 million. Later that year, to commemorate the 400th year of Shakespeare's death, the soap revisited his work, with a week of episodes focusing specifically on his sonnets. The cast filmed scenes at the Royal Shakespeare Company in Stratford-upon-Avon for the episodes, one of which includes Heston reciting Sonnet 73 to girlfriend Ruhma Hanif (Bharti Patel). Series producer Lloyd also stated that due to the rise of homelessness in the Birmingham area that year, the soap would be featuring a week that focuses on homelessness. The "emotional and powerful" homelessness week aired in May 2016. Script editor Nasreen Ahmed stated that lots of research went into the week, with researchers constantly finding new statistics and information. She added that it was tricky to cover the "darker stuff" with their daytime transmission slot, but opined that Doctors is the perfect platform for a homelessness storyline, due to the links to the medical surgery.

2017–present: Ratings increase and pandemic
In 2017, ratings for Doctors improved, averaging at 2.5 million viewers, with a peak of 4 million. In May 2018, Doctors aired another themed week, based around mental health. The transmission dates coincided with Mental Health Awareness Week. Writer Andrew Cornish felt that due to the seriousness of the topic, it felt "counter-productive and unrealistic" to "drop" regular characters into numerous mental health-related storylines for that one week, so he planned to have several storylines come to a head in the week. These included Rob Hollins' (Chris Walker) PTSD and Al Haskey's (Ian Midlane) struggle with the diagnosis of his mother's dementia. In November 2019, it was confirmed via Twitter that Doctors were filming for the 20th anniversary episode. As part of the celebrations for the milestone, Julia Parsons (Diane Keen) briefly returned to the series. It was also revealed that every regular cast member in the series will be featured in a scene together. To celebrate the 20th year of Doctors, a competition was opened for viewers to visit the set at BBC Drama Village on 18 March 2020. However, due to the COVID-19 pandemic, the set tour was postponed, and it was later announced that filming of Doctors had too been postponed due to the virus. On 26 March 2020, a 60-minute episode titled "A Day in the Life..." was broadcast, which saw the conclusion of a long-running prison storyline involving Jimmi Clay (Adrian Lewis Morgan), and a documentary being made about The Mill. Also in March 2020, an episode starring Joe Pasquale was broadcast. The episode, titled "The Joe Pasquale Problem", displays patient Lizzie Milton (Adele James) with the Fregoli delusion, seeing everyone as Pasquale. The episode went viral on Twitter and Beth Maloney of Entertainment Daily described the episode as "bizarre but amazing".

On 22 May 2020, despite having the government's permission to recommence production on set, Doctors announced that a lockdown episode was being filmed at cast members' homes using their mobile phones. Doctors became the first soap opera to address the pandemic, as well as the first to film an episode solely using mobile devices. The episode, titled "Can You Hear Me?", aired on 12 June 2020. On the same day of the episode's broadcast, series producer Peter Eryl Lloyd announced that the production team had donated all personal protective equipment (PPE) to the NHS, so upon the programme's return, the characters would not be wearing PPE in scenes broadcast on television. In August 2020, it was announced that Doctors had resumed filming, with Hobson stating that it was a "long process of preparing the set, the crew and actors, to make sure we are working in the safest environment possible". Cast members had to do their own hair and makeup looks until 2022.

Doctors returned to transmission on 2 November with four weekly episodes, rather than the typical five. Series producer Lloyd stated that upon its return, the characters are in a "post Covid world, where social distancing and mask wearing are things of the past, but the ongoing effects of the virus are very much part of everyday life". Episodes in 2020 had an average of 1.6 million live viewers. In December 2020, it was announced that Doctors would be taking another extended transmission break until February, with no episodes set to be broadcast throughout January 2021. The series returned on 8 February 2021. On 12 October 2021, it was announced that Doctors would partake in a special crossover event involving multiple British soaps to promote the topic of climate change ahead of the 2021 United Nations Climate Change Conference. It was confirmed that a character from Doctors would appear on Coronation Street. In June 2022, it was announced that after two years, Doctors would return to transmitting five weekly episodes. The added episode was added to schedules from September 2022, following the show's summer break. In February 2023, episodes of Doctors that featured an explosion at a medical conference were pulled from television schedules hours before their set transmisison; the BBC announced that this was due to being set to air at the same time as the 2023 Turkey–Syria earthquake, which they opined would have been insensitive.

Cast and characters

Series regulars of Doctors are met by series producers and executive producers for several rounds of auditions prior to their casting. Series producer Lloyd stated that as well as looking for talent, they look for somebody who is able to fit into the team of hardworking cast members due to the heavy filming schedule. Once cast on the series, actors are given detailed notes about their character, including their backstory, personality, characterisation and any other relevant details. Earlier episodes included a noticeably smaller cast, with episodes more self-contained. However, with the increased number of episodes, the cast also increased to include continuing storylines. The original nine regular characters to be introduced in Doctors were Anoushka Flynn (Carli Norris), Joanna Helm (Sarah Manners), Kate (Maggie Cronin) and Mac McGuire (Christopher Timothy), Caroline Powers (Jacqueline Leonard), Helen Thompson (Corrinne Wicks), Rana Mistry (Akbar Kurtha), Ruth Harding (Yvonne Brewster) and Steve Rawlings (Mark Frost).

In 2005, Holby City actor Adrian Lewis Morgan was cast in the role of Jimmi Clay. Appearing continuously since, he has become the longest serving actor on Doctors. Also during the 2000s, numerous other longstanding characters were introduced, including: Daniel Granger (Matthew Chambers), Heston Carter (Brenman), Ruth Pearce (Chilton), and Zara Carmichael (Elisabeth Dermot Walsh). 2009 saw the introduction of the Hollins family; Karen (Jan Pearson), Rob (Chris Walker), Imogen (Charlie Clemmow) and Jack Hollins (Nicolas Woodman). Mrs Tembe (Lorna Laidlaw) was introduced as a receptionist at the Mill in 2011, who eventually became the practice manager. In 2012, several regular characters were introduced into the series, including general practitioner Mandy Marquez (Danielle Henry), practice manager Howard Bellamy (Ian Kelsey), police surgeon Jas Khella (Vineeta Rishi), general practitioner and police surgeon Emma Reid (Dido Miles), receptionist Valerie Pitman (Sarah Moyle) and general practitioner Al Haskey (Ian Midlane). Practice nurse Ayesha Lee (Laura Rollins) made her debut appearance in 2014. Midwife Ruhma Hanif (Patel) and general practitioner Sid Vere (Ashley Rice) were introduced in 2015. After the departure of Mrs Tembe, Ali Bastian was cast as practice manager Becky Clarke in 2019. Later in 2019, Bastian left Doctors after becoming pregnant, and in the programme, she is replaced by business manager Bear Sylvester (Dex Lee). Nurse Luca McIntyre (Ross McLaren) joined the series in 2021, while receptionist Scarlett Kiernan (Kia Pegg) debuted in 2022. 2023 then saw the castings of receptionist Kirsty Millar (Kiruna Stamell) and doctor Nina Bulsara (Wendi Peters).

Alongside the regular cast, Doctors features numerous recurring and guest characters. Recurring characters typically have a connection to the regulars, such as Izzie Torres (Bethan Moore), the daughter of Daniel, Eve Haskey (Rachel Bell), the mother of Al, and Hazeem Durrani (Ashraf Ejjbair), the nephew of Ruhma. Following a storyline that sees the Mill take over Sutton Vale Surgery, several new recurring characters were introduced: receptionist Rosie Colton (Janice Connolly), trainee doctor Princess Buchanan (Laura White) and nurse prescriber Maeve Ludlow (Clelia Murphy). Despite also being overseen by the executive production team, producers and directors cast the recurring characters for their own respective stories. Doctors also features guest stars in each episode, with examples including Emilia Clarke, Alison Hammond, Ruthie Henshall, Jamelia, Claire King, Joe Pasquale, Eddie Redmayne, Lisa Riley and Sheridan Smith. With each new block, a noticeboard on the set is updated with photographs of the guest actors for that block. Series producer Lloyd estimated that at least 800 guest stars are contracted on the soap per year; owing to the large number of actors who have made a guest appearance, Doctors has gained a reputation for becoming "a British actor's rite of passage".

Storylines

2000s: McGuire family and Vivien March's rape
The storylines originally dealt with the lives of staff and patients at the fictional Riverside Health Centre and its secondary location, the Best Practice. During the early years, many storylines revolved around the lead character of Mac and his family life. These storylines include his romance with Julia Parsons (Diane Keen) as well as his son, Liam McGuire (Tim Matthews), facing a sexual assault allegation. 2006 saw George Woodson (Stirling Gallacher) suffer from post-natal depression after having daughter Bracken (Jessica Gallagher). Bracken becomes ill after being rejected, which leads to George overcoming her depression. Also in 2006, Faith Walker (Eva Fontaine) is diagnosed with retinitis pigmentosa, and since it would result in the loss of her eyesight, she hands her job over to Michelle Corrigan (Donnaleigh Bailey). Doctor Peter Kendrick (Robert Cavanah) becomes depressed and commits suicide, a storyline that saw Doctors receive its first Best Storyline nomination at the British Soap Awards. Julia discovers that Mac is having an affair in 2006, and demands he leave Letherbridge, buying his share in the Mill after his exit. In 2007, when more episodes were shown and there were fewer breaks in transmission, storylines included: receptionist Donna Parmar (Martha Howe Douglas) breaking patient confidentiality and her sacking from the Mill (2007), Nick West's (Michael McKell) car crash and later death (2008) and receptionist Vivien March's (Anita Carey) rape (2008), which saw an influx of awards. 2009 also saw the departure of longstanding family unit Ronnie (Seán Gleeson), George and Bracken.

2010s: Hollins family and deaths
In 2011, Karen falls pregnant and has an abortion, which leads to a breakdown in her relationship with Rob, and their later separation. 2011 also sees the murder of temporary receptionist Lauren Porter (Alexis Peterman) by Harrison Kellor (James Larkin). Both of these storylines saw nods for Best Storyline at the British Soap Awards. In 2012, Heston embarks on a relationship with health visitor Marina Bonnaire (Marian McLoughlin), which sees Heston subjected to domestic abuse. 2012 also sees Zara and Daniel have a baby, Joe Granger Carmichael, and after Emma's introduction to the Mill, she becomes involved in a storyline that sees her assist her paralysed husband Sam (Grant Masters) to die. After Keen departed from her role as Julia, Howard becomes practice manager. Zara and Daniel decide to separate after she finds out about his affair with Cherry Malone (Sophie Abelson), the wife of Jimmi. In 2013, Mrs Tembe gains a new love interest – Gordon Clement (Steven Elder), the vicar of her church. Later that year, Jas is harassed by an obsessive stalker, Al. In 2014, Karen is involved in a car accident, and suffers severe head trauma and as a result, loses all of her memories from the age of 18 onwards. She spends months trying to readjust, knowing that she has two adult children and a husband. After Jas leaves Letherbridge, doctor Niamh Donoghue (Jessica Regan) is hired at the Mill, and she begins a relationship with Al. Heston struggles with memory loss and undergoes several tests designed to determine whether he has early-onset dementia. Mandy decides that it is time to move on from the Mill and is replaced by Ayesha.

In 2015, Doctors''' 3000th episode was transmitted, in which a special storyline was created centring on a number of the main characters, most specifically Rob; when he was younger, he caused a car accident, but his childhood friend, took the blame as Rob was about to enter the police force. That same year, Howard dies of a brain aneurism. In 2016, Anthony Harker (Adam Astill) joins as a new practice manager, and he bullies Mrs Tembe, who leaves to work for a rival surgery. Anthony's autocratic management style then targets Jimmi, who forms a plan with Mrs Tembe and Daniel to take over the Mill. Mrs Tembe is offered his position, to which she accepts. 2016 also sees the beginning of a fostering storyline for Karen and Rob, with the pair getting the necessary training to become foster parents. The Doctors research team worked with British charity The Fostering Network for a year ahead of the storyline in order to represent fostering accurately, and they credited the programme with an insurgence of fostering representation on television. Whilst the fostering storyline was airing, the producers also decided to introduce a long-running post-traumatic stress disorder storyline for Rob.

In 2018, Zara and Daniel are driven apart again, this time by Daniel's daughter Izzie, who pushes Zara to her limits. Zara slaps Izzie, causing Daniel to walk out on her. After Daniel returns home, he finds a drunken Zara has slept with Sid, which results in Daniel punching Sid and ending his relationship with Zara. 2018 also featured a car accident involving a number of characters, which led to the death of Heston. In 2019, Mrs Tembe becomes engaged to Gordon, and decides to leave Letherbridge with him; Mrs Tembe meets Becky, who she hires as the new practice manager of the Mill. Becky begins a relationship with Daniel, and eventually becomes pregnant. However, she miscarries, and Daniel sees it as an opportunity to reveal that he does not want more kids, and that he has cheated on her with Zara. Becky ends her relationship with Daniel, and departs from the Mill. Becky is replaced by business manager Bear. Sid tracks down his long-lost brother, Laurence Richards (Rishard Beckett), who he learns was put up for adoption by his parents since he has Down syndrome. In late 2019, twin brothers Adam and Gareth Regan (Edward MacLiam) are introduced. Adam begins a relationship with Zara, while Gareth moves in with Emma. Weeks into their relationships, it transpires that Gareth is addicted to drugs and jealous of his brother. He goes to Zara's house pretending to be Adam and attempts to rape Zara. He is subsequently arrested and charged. In the final episodes of 2019, Jimmi begins to experience strange events; he is mugged, his house alarm alerts on several occasions, and strangers arrive at the Icon asking for him. He is eventually arrested for the possession of drugs, and despite the staff at the Mill trying to prove his innocence and get him freed in time for Christmas, they fail.

2020s: Sutton Vale takeover
The beginning of 2020 saw Jimmi's colleagues discover that Jimmi has been framed by his solicitor, John Butler (Richard Huw). Daniel and Zara rekindle their relationship, while Ruhma is temporarily suspended from her midwifery role. Another focus of 2020 was Karen and Rob's fostering experiences, including Abz Baker's (Amy Bowden) rape and Jayden Hunt's (Ciaran Stow) epilepsy. They are then given the responsibility of caring for Tom (Max True) and Ella Robson (Lily-Mae Evans), after it is claimed they witnessed their father murder their mother. It later transpires that Ella killed her, due to their mother abusing their father. 2020 also saw the departure of Ayesha, when she is given the opportunity to front a worldwide malaria campaign. Lily Walker (Verity Rushworth) is temporarily hired at the Mill, and after a brief relationship with Al, she stalks him. 2021 saw Luca's introduction; his initial storylines involve grieving for his dead boyfriend and having his HIV positive status exposed to the public, which leads to a negative response. Other focuses of 2021 included the breakdown and eventual reconciliation of Karen and Rob's marriage, Sid feeling unsure about his medical career, Bear and his mother experiencing racism in the medical industry and Valerie marrying herself after a cancer scare. The focus of 2022 was the Mill's takeover of Sutton Vale, which featured the introduction of numerous characters such as Princess, Scarlett and Maeve. This created individual storylines that saw Princess bully and manipulate Scarlett, Maeve beginning a relationship with Jimmi which ends in Maeve confessing to fraud and Scarlett's struggle with the cost of living crisis. It climaxed in the murder investigation of Dr. Ashdown, Sutton Vale's former lead GP, and numerous characters were included as suspects.

Reception
Awards and nominations

In 2003, Doctors was nominated for Best British Soap at the British Soap Awards for the first time, where it has been nominated annually since. The next year, Doctors won their first award at the British Soap Awards, when they won Best Single Episode for "Say A Little Prayer". In 2005, Andrea Green won the British Soap Award for Best Newcomer for her role as Sarah Finch. At the 2009 British Soap Awards, Vivien's rape won the award for Best Storyline; Carey also won the award for Best Female Dramatic Performance for her role in the storyline. The storyline was nominated again at the 2018 ceremony in the category of Greatest Moment. Also at the 2018 ceremony, Doctors won a shared award with fellow BBC soap EastEnders. Both soaps won the award for Scene of the Year; the first time two soaps have won a singular award. At the 2019 ceremony, Moyle received the Best Comedy Performance award for her portrayal of Valerie. Doctors won Best Single Episode once again in 2022 for "Three Consultations and a Funeral", with the panel stating that if the episode had aired in a primetime slot, it could have won a BAFTA Award.Doctors is nominated annually at the Inside Soap Awards. Laidlaw won the award for Best Daytime Star for her role as Mrs Tembe in 2017, while the soap itself won Best Daytime Soap the following year. The soap has also received annual longlist nominations from the National Television Awards, with Walsh having two nominations for her role as Zara Carmichael. At the Royal Television Society Midlands Awards, Miles has won the award for Acting Performance of the Year twice, in 2013 and 2017. Doctors has also won the Drama award three times at the ceremony. At the 2021 ceremony, Lucy Benjamin won the Acting Performance award for her role as Jan Fisher in the episode "Three Consultations and a Funeral", which also won the award in the Scripted category. In 2017, the Writers' Guild of Great Britain awarded the soap for Best Long Running TV Series. Later that year, script editor Ahmed won the Services to Media award at the British Muslim Awards.

Critical receptionGuardian writer Kathryn Hearn opined that Doctors is the best show on television. She appreciated the "rich, three-dimensional characters" in the series, as well as the storylines taken from real life, noting the storyline that saw a paedophile ring exposed. Hearn applauded the writers for tackling issue-led storylines which she always found to be accurate, noting their representation of immigration, underage sex, upskirting, mental health and homelessness. Hearn also appreciated the casting on the series. She felt that unlike other soaps, the characters "look ordinary" and are realistic to life. She hoped that more people would begin watching the soap as she felt it was "treated as the bridesmaid, never the bride". Ammar Kalia, another Guardian writer, praised Doctors on its 20th anniversary. He described it as "the perfect medicine" during the COVID-19 pandemic and found it to be the best offering of the British daytime schedule. he hoped that due to most of the UK public staying at home during the pandemic, the series would pick up more viewers and that it would continue long past its 20th anniversary. Roz Laws, writing for the Birmingham Mail complimented Doctors for its ability to mix comedy with serious stories. Laws also felt that the soap's diversity was ahead of other soaps, noting particularly that their first gay wedding was years before any of the others.

The storylines have also received praise from health professionals. Paul Daverson, a mental health nurse, was impressed with how accurately Doctors covered mental health. He found that the soap covered the issues sensitively and accurately and it gave Daverson hope for the depiction of mental health issues on television. He noted Jimmi Clay's (Morgan) counselling sessions and Ruth Pearce's (Chilton) psychotic breakdown were especially accurate. He praised the latter for being a brave depiction since it aired in the 2000s, a time he felt it was rare for mental health to be portrayed correctly. He noted that the series had always been progressive, particularly for a daytime series, and that as well as covering mental health issues, Doctors was also great at covering LGBTQ+ topics. He highlighted Simon Bond (David Sturzaker), a gay doctor, whose character he found not to be completely focused on his sexuality and "who just happened to be gay". He was also appreciative of Doctors'' for covering Marina Bonnaire (McLoughlin) abusing Heston Carter (Brenman), the first time he had seen a woman abusing a man on television.

References

External links
 
 

 
2000 British television series debuts
2000s British medical television series
2000s British television soap operas
2000s British workplace drama television series
2010s British medical television series
2010s British television soap operas
2010s British workplace drama television series
2020s British television soap operas
2020s British medical television series
2020s British workplace drama television series
BBC medical television shows
BBC television dramas
BBC television soap operas
British medical television series
English-language television shows
Television productions suspended due to the COVID-19 pandemic
Television series by BBC Studios
Television shows set in Birmingham, West Midlands